Hammertown may refer to:

 A nickname for the Canadian city of Hamilton, Ontario
Hammertown, Ontario, Canada, a community in the township of King
Hammertown, New York, USA, on county road 83 in Dutchess County
 A town setup for the King of the Hammers race in Johnson Valley, California

See also
 Hammerton (disambiguation)